"Us and Them" is a song by the English progressive rock band Pink Floyd, from their 1973 album The Dark Side of the Moon. The music was written by Richard Wright with lyrics by Roger Waters. It is sung by David Gilmour, with harmonies by Wright. The song is 7minutes and 49 seconds, the longest on the album.

"Us and Them" was released as the second single from The Dark Side of the Moon in the United States, peaking at No. 72 on the Cash Box Top 100 Singles chart in March 1974. The single peaked at No. 85 in the Canadian chart.

Composition

Richard Wright introduces the song with harmonies on his Hammond organ, and put a piano chordal backing and short piano solo afterwards on the arrangement. The tune was originally written on the piano by Wright for the film Zabriskie Point in 1969 and was titled "The Violent Sequence". In its original demo form it was instrumental, featuring only piano and bass. Director Michelangelo Antonioni rejected it on the grounds that it was too unlike material such as "Careful with That Axe, Eugene", which was the style of music he wanted to use. As Roger Waters recalls it in impersonation, Antonioni's response was: "It's beautiful, but is a too sad, you know? It makes me think of church". The song was then shelved until the making of The Dark Side of the Moon.

The lyrics of the song were written by Waters. They describe the senseless nature of war and the ignorance of modern-day humans who have been taken over by consumerism and materialism. In an interview, Waters shared the significance of each verse:

The verses have a unique, jazz-influenced chord progression: Dsus2, D6add9 (or Esus2/D), Dminor major 7, and G/D. The tonic of D, alternating with the dominant, A, is sustained on bass guitar as a pedal point throughout the verses. The D6 with an added 9th is not unlike an Esus2 with a D in the bass, but because the bass line also provides the fifth, it is more accurately described as a kind of Dchord. The D minor chord with a major seventh is a rarity in 1970s rock music. There is also a secondary sequence, louder, with thick vocal harmonies, with a progression of Bminor, Amajor, Gmajor seventh suspended second, commonly written as "Gmaj7sus2" (enharmonic to the slash chord D/G), and Cmajor. This progression is played twice between each verse, and is not unlike a chorus, except that the lyrics are different with each repeat.

In the middle, there is a break during which roadie Roger "The Hat" Manifold speaks.

It was also re-released on the 2001 best of album, Echoes: The Best of Pink Floyd, where it is the seventh track of the second disc. The ending of the song was edited in this version, with the vocals from the last measure treated with heavy delay, and the music track muted entirely, to avoid the seamless transition to "Any Colour You Like" that occurs on The Dark Side of the Moon.

Spoken parts

The following dialogue by the band's roadie, Roger "The Hat" Manifold, one of his two spoken segments on the album, is heard before the second saxophone solo (5:04):

Reception
Cash Box called it a "hypnotizing ballad" that is "as pretty as it is commercial." Record World called it an "ethereal number."

Alternative and live versions
The original demo from the Zabriskie Point sessions was released on The Dark Side of the Moon Immersion Box Set in 2011.
The instrumental "Violent Sequence" was performed on a handful of occasions in early 1970. These performances were much the same as the Zabriskie Point demo, with some added percussion from Nick Mason. On at least two occasions, the song was paired with another piece from the Zabriskie sessions, "Heart Beat, Pig Meat".
In early 1972 performances, a short audio clip of a man groaning in torturous pain would be played at the beginning of the song, immediately highlighting the song's theme of violence. The song did not include any saxophone and the lead vocals were performed by Waters and Wright, with David Gilmour providing backing vocals.
It was occasionally featured as an encore during the band's 1977 "In the Flesh" tour (this was performed at most shows on the band's 1977 US tours during the encore). It was often used to intentionally calm the often rowdy stadium audiences.
P·U·L·S·E and the second disc and video of Delicate Sound of Thunder feature this track. Both versions are shorter than the original studio recording, and the latter features a slightly altered saxophone solo. The Delicate Sound of Thunder recording ends on a major key before being interrupted by the sound effects from Money, effectively reversing the original sequence. This same order of events was also used on 1994 nights that didn't include the entire Dark Side of the Moon in sequence.
On Echoes: The Best of Pink Floyd, the song has a different ending: instead of segueing into what would be the next track on The Dark Side of the Moon ("Any Colour You Like"), engineer and Floyd collaborator James Guthrie gave the song a cold ending, before adding a backwards piano note that would lead into the collection's next track, "Learning to Fly".
Waters included the song in his 2006–08 The Dark Side of the Moon Live tour, with Jon Carin replacing Gilmour on lead vocals, and Waters replacing Wright on harmony vocals.
Waters performed the song during his set during the live TV Benefit concert "12-12-12: The Concert for Sandy Relief" (2012). This version ends with a full stop but while Pink Floyd sans Waters closed it on a D major, Waters instead opted for a B minor chord.
Gilmour played the song on his Rattle That Lock Tour 2015–16, with an ending similar to that of the 1988–1989 tour.
Waters performed the song during his 2017-2018 concert tour, released as the concert film Us + Them (2019). The ending (cold ending with decaying vocal echo) is closer to the version of the Echoes compilation.

Personnel
David Gilmour – electric guitars, lead vocals (verses and choruses)
Richard Wright – Hammond organ, piano, harmony vocals (choruses)
Roger Waters – bass guitar
Nick Mason – drums

Additional personnel
Dick Parry – tenor saxophone
Lesley Duncan – backing vocals
Doris Troy – backing vocals
Barry St. John – backing vocals
Liza Strike – backing vocals

See also
 List of anti-war songs

References

External links

[ AMG review]

1974 singles
Pink Floyd songs
Anti-war songs
1970s ballads
Songs written by Richard Wright (musician)
Songs written by Roger Waters
Song recordings produced by David Gilmour
Song recordings produced by Roger Waters
Song recordings produced by Richard Wright (musician)
Song recordings produced by Nick Mason
Harvest Records singles
Rock ballads
1973 songs
Jazz fusion songs